Blaž Jarc (born 17 July 1988) is a Slovenian former professional cyclist, who competed professionally between 2007 and 2014.

Major results

2005
 1st  Road race, National Junior Road Championships
2007
 5th Gran Premio della Liberazione
2009
 1st  Time trial, National Under-23 Road Championships
 8th Time trial, UCI Under-23 Road World Championships
 10th Time trial, UEC European Under-23 Road Championships
2010
 1st  Time trial, National Under-23 Road Championships
 3rd ZLM Tour
 9th Gran Premio Industria e Commercio Artigianato Carnaghese
2011
 1st Porec Trophy
 2nd Overall Tour of Gallipoli
1st Stage 1 (ITT)
 6th Tour of Vojvodina II
 7th Memoriał Henryka Łasaka
 8th Rund um Köln
2012
 4th Schaal Sels
 6th Dutch Food Valley Classic
2013
 1st Grote Prijs Stad Zottegem
 6th Omloop van het Houtland
 7th Halle–Ingooigem
2014
 3rd Time trial, National Road Championships

References

External links
 
 

1988 births
Living people
Slovenian male cyclists